The 65 Division is a  division of the Sri Lanka Army. Established on 15 Dec 2008, the division was based in Alankulam near Thunukkai in the Northern Province. Today the division is a part of Security Forces Headquarters – Wanni and has three brigades and eight battalions.

Organisation
The division has following sub units:
 651 Brigade (based in Pooneryn, Northern Province)
 19th Battalion, Sri Lanka Light Infantry
 11th Volunteer Battalion, Gajaba Regiment (based in Mulankavil, Northern Province)
 652 Brigade (based in Anaivilunthankulam, Northern Province)
 20th Volunteer Battalion, Vijayabahu Infantry Regiment
 7th Battalion, Sri Lanka National Guard
 653 Brigade (based in Alankulam, Northern Province)
 10th Battalion, Sri Lanka Light Infantry
 21st Volunteer Battalion, Sri Lanka Light Infantry

References

2008 establishments in Sri Lanka
Infantry units and formations of Sri Lanka
Military units and formations established in 2008
Organisations based in Northern Province, Sri Lanka
Sri Lanka Army divisions